Orostachys japonica (Japanese：爪蓮華、昭和、秀女）also known as rock pine is a species of flowering plant in the family Crassulaceae. Native to East Asia. Its main  habitat is on the surface of mountain rocks in Korea, Japan and China.

Ecology 
It is in flower from September to October. The flowers are hermaphrodite. The rosette leaves shape like a spatula.
Suitable for: light sandy and loamy soils, prefers well-drained soil and can grow in nutritionally poor soil.
Suitable pH: acid, neutral and basic alkaline soils.

Because of its growing shape which resembles a pine tree's cone, and its habit of growing on mountain rocks, it is also called rock pine.
It grows well in a sunny or semi-shaded(light woodland) location with a well-drained and moist soil that is low in nutrients.
Its flowers bloom from September to October. The flowers are white and each flower has 5 conical petals. The flower lacks a peduncle. Its calyx is divided into 5 parts. When the flowers bloom and produce seeds, it dries out.

Medicinal uses 
The leaves and stems contain several medically active constituents including fatty acid esters, Friedelin and flavonoids. They are antispasmodic and cytotoxic. It has anti-cancer effects in vitro. In Korea, they are used in the treatment of cancer, gingivitis, coagulation and metritis.

References 

Crassulaceae
Flora of Asia
Plants described in 1883
Medicinal plants
Edible plants
Taxa named by Alwin Berger
Taxa named by Karl Maximovich